Edward Barrett (11 June 1846 – 23 December 1923) was an English cricketer.

Barrett made his first-class debut for Hampshire in 1885. Barrett played two first-class matches for Hampshire in 1885 against Surrey and Sussex.

Barrett died in London on 23 December 1923, survived by his wife Ella.

Family
Barrett's son Edward Barrett, Jr. played first-class cricket for Hampshire and the Marylebone Cricket Club.

References

External links
Edward Barrett at Cricinfo
Edward Barrett at CricketArchive

1846 births
1923 deaths
English cricketers
Hampshire cricketers